Local Ground is the ninth studio album by Irish folk music group Altan, released in March 2005 on the Narada label.

Recording 
For the recording of Local Ground, Altan invited a few of their friends in music to play on the album. Former Bothy Band founder Tríona Ní Dhomhnaill plays piano on guitarist Dáithí Sproule's composition "The Roseville", a kind of a slip-reel. Steve Cooney guests on bass and Dónal Lunny adds guitar. Altan have asked Galician piper Carlos Núñez to contribute some gaita (Galician bagpipes) to two tracks. Bodhrán maestro Jim Higgins provides the rhythmic pulse on many of the tracks while Graham Henderson adds some touches of keyboard colour to a set of reels.

Artwork and title 
The cover art is a reproduction of a painting by Kilkenny-based artist Bernadette Kiely. The album title "Local Ground" comes from the painting title.

Critical reception 
Local Ground received a very positive review from the musicscotland.com website, describing it as «an album of beauty, energy, grace and finesse, retaining the enthusiasm that originally shaped [Altan's] music.»

The album also received a warm review from Amazon.com website's critic Christina Roden, stating: «For [Local Ground], the veteran Irish ensemble has gathered 13 traditional and newly composed tunes. [...] The set list includes several of the jaunty dance tunes that are the soul of Irish music. [...] Mairéad Ní Mhaonaigh's fragile, girlish soprano creates many of the album's most memorable moments [such as] "Adieu My Lovely Nancy" and [the] lullaby "Dun Do Shuil". [...] The entire album has home-town warmth to it, a sense of achieved heritage that is at once soothing and invigorating.»

Track listing 
Source

All songs, medleys and tunes are traditional, except as indicated.

2021 re-issue
Originally released in the US in March 2005 by Narada Records, Local Ground had been unavailable for several years. Compass Records (Altan's label partner since the 2012 release of Gleann Nimhe – The Poison Glen and home to most of the band's catalog) re-issued Local Ground on 12 March 2021. The 14-track Deluxe re-issue includes a bonus track "Andy Dixon's/Ríl Chois Claidigh/The Swilly Reel," which was previously only available on the Japanese release (also long out of print).

Personnel

Altan 
Adapted from the AllMusic credits.
Mairéad Ní Mhaonaigh – fiddle, vocals
Ciaran Tourish – fiddle, whistle, backing vocals
Ciarán Curran – bouzouki, mandolin
Mark Kelly – guitar, bouzouki, backing vocals
Dermot Byrne – Accordion
Dáithí Sproule – guitar, backing vocals

Guest musicians 
Stephen Cooney – bass
Graham Henderson – keyboards
Jim Higgins – percussion, bodhrán
Dónal Lunny – guitar
Tríona Ní Dhomhnaill – piano
Carlos Núñez – whistle, bagpipes (Galician gaita)

Production 
Alvin Sweeney – engineer
Bernadette Kiely – artwork
Édain O'Donnell – photography

Track notes 
"Éirigh 's Cuir Ort Do Chuid Éadaigh": guitar – Dónal Lunny; percussion – Jim Higgins; the title of the song means "Arise now and dress yourself quickly"
"Tommy Peoples/The Road to Cashel/The Repeal of the Union/Richie's Reel": bodhrán – Jim Higgins; keyboards – Graham Henderson
"Is the Big Man Within?/Tilly Finn's Reel": bodhrán – Jim Higgins; whistle, bagpipes (Galician gaita) – Carlos Núñez
"Adieu, My Lovely Nancy": bass – Stephen Cooney; percussion – Jim Higgins
"Bó Mhín Na Toitean/Con McGinley's Highland/Seanamhach Tube Station"
"Amhrán Pheadair Bhreathnaigh": bass – Stephen Cooney; translated by Proinsias Ó Maonaigh
"The Roseville": percussion – Jim Higgins; piano – Tríona Ní Dhomhnaill
"As I Roved Out"
"Spórt": percussion – Jim Higgins
"The Humours of Castlefin/Nia's Dance/An Dúidín": bass – Stephen Cooney; percussion – Jim Higgins
"The Wind and Rain": bass – Stephen Cooney; bodhrán – Jim Higgins
"The Silver Slipper": percussion – Jim Higgins; whistle, bagpipes (Galician gaita) – Carlos Núñez
"Dún Do Shúil": backing vocals – Ciaran Tourish, Dáithí Sproule, Mark Kelly; keyboards – Graham Henderson; translated by Proinsias Ó Maonaigh; the title of the song means "Close Your Eyes"

Live performances 
Altan played live in concert the following tracks: 
"Is the Big Man Within?/Tilly Finn's Reel"
"The Roseville"
"As I Roved Out"
"The Humours of Castlefin/Nia's Dance/An Dúidín"
"The Silver Slipper"
"Dún Do Shúil"

References 
Notes

Altan (band) albums
2005 albums
Narada Productions albums